Malmsmead Bridge is a 17th-century stone bridge which crosses Badgworthy Water in the hamlet of Malmsmead, on the road between Oare and Brendon. The Badgworthy Water forms the boundary between the counties of Somerset and Devon, and the bridge is therefore shared between both counties, as well as being within the Exmoor National Park. It has been scheduled as an ancient monument and is a Grade II listed building.

References

External links

Bridges completed in the 17th century
Bridges in Devon
Bridges in Somerset
Scheduled monuments in Devon
Scheduled monuments in West Somerset
Grade II listed bridges
Grade II listed buildings in Devon
Grade II listed buildings in West Somerset
Packhorse bridges
Stone bridges in the United Kingdom